George Alexander Norris (24 December 1928 – 12 March 2013) was a Canadian artist and sculptor. Norris is best known for his many public sculptures in Vancouver, British Columbia.

Biography 
George Norris was born in Victoria, British Columbia on Christmas Eve 1928 to George and Christina Norris. He studied at the Vancouver School of Art, and later under the tutelage of Ivan Meštrović at Syracuse University. In 1955 he won a British Council scholarship to study at the Slade School of Fine Art in London. Following this period he returned to Vancouver where he began his professional career.

Among Norris's best-known works are The Crab (1967), located outside the H. R. MacMillan Space Centre in Vancouver, and the panels on the University of Victoria's McPherson Library (1963).

In 1960 Norris married Phyllis Piddington, who had grown up at "Wychbury" on Esquimalt, an estate home designed by Samuel Maclure. They had three children: Anna, Samuel, and Alexander. In 1993 the couple moved to Shawnigan Lake. After Norris suffered a head injury in a hiking accident, the couple moved to Victoria in 2008. Norris died on 12 March 2013 at age 84.

Works

References 

1928 births
2013 deaths
20th-century Canadian sculptors
Canadian male sculptors
20th-century Canadian male artists
Artists from Victoria, British Columbia